"In the Heart of a Woman" is a song written by Keith Hinton and Brett Cartwright, and recorded by American country music singer Billy Ray Cyrus. It was released in June 1993 as the first single from his platinum-selling second album, It Won't Be the Last. The song peaked at number 3 on the Billboard Hot Country Singles & Tracks (now Hot Country Songs) chart.

Music video
The music video was directed by Charley Randazzo and premiered in mid-1993.

Chart performance
"In the Heart of a Woman" debuted at number 60 on the U.S. Billboard Hot Country Singles & Tracks for the week of July 3, 1993.

Year-end charts

References

1993 singles
1993 songs
Billy Ray Cyrus songs
RPM Country Tracks number-one singles of the year
Mercury Records singles